Live in Carré is a live album by The Dubliners. Recorded live in Amsterdam in October 1983, this album featured Luke Kelly's final recordings with The Dubliners.

Track listing
All tracks Traditional; arranged by The Dubliners unless otherwise stated
Side One:
"Sweets of May"
"Dicey Reilly"
"Song for Ireland" (Phil Colclough)
"Building Up and Tearing England Down" (Dominic Behan)
"Dunphy's Hornpipe/Leitrim Fancy/Down the Broom"
"Dirty Old Town" (Ewan McColl)
"The Old Triangle" (Brendan Behan)

Side Two:
"The Waterford Boys/Reels: The Humours of Scariff/The Flannel Jacket"
"Galway Races"
"The Prodigal Son" (John Sheahan)
"Whiskey in the Jar"
"The Sick Note" (Pat Cooksey)
"The Wild Rover"
"Seven Drunken Nights"

Personnel
 Seán Cannon - vocals, acoustic guitar
 Ronnie Drew - vocals, acoustic guitar
 Luke Kelly - vocals, banjo, spoons
 Barney McKenna - vocals, tenor banjo, mandolin
 John Sheahan - fiddle, tin whistle, vocals

References
https://web.archive.org/web/20070927230519/http://www.theballadeers.com/DUBS_D43_carre.htm

The Dubliners live albums
1985 live albums
Polydor Records live albums